Calder Hill is a small mountain chain in the Central New York region of New York. It is located north of Otego, New York. It is made of two main peaks with the highest being 1841 feet.

Calder Hill was named after Godfrey Calder.

References

Mountains of Otsego County, New York
Mountains of New York (state)